Paul Brock may refer to:

 Paul Brock (journalist) (1932-2021), American journalist and film producer
 Paul Brock (musician) (born 1944), Irish musician